Retiro station may refer to:

Buenos Aires, Argentina
 Retiro bus station, the main bus terminal
 Retiro railway station, a railway station complex, comprising:
Retiro (Line C Buenos Aires Underground)
Retiro (Line E Buenos Aires Underground)
Retiro Belgrano railway station, serving the Belgrano Norte Line and the General Manuel Belgrano Railway
Retiro Mitre railway station, serving the Mitre Line and the General Bartolomé Mitre Railway
Retiro San Martín railway station, serving the San Martín Line and the General San Martín Railway

Spain
 Retiro (Madrid Metro), a railway station in Madrid